Hwaseong FC (Korean: 화성 FC) is a South Korean semi-professional football club based in Hwaseong, South Korea. They currently play in the K3 League, the third tier of the South Korean football club.

History

Founding
The club was founded on 23 January 2013.

Team colours
The current team uniform consists of an orange shirt, white shorts and white socks.

Season by season records

Honours

Domestic Competition

League
K3 League
 Winners : (2) 2014, 2019

The team managed to finish top of their group in their first season, but lost to Pocheon FC in the playoff stage. In only their second year of competition the club again finished top of their group and progressed to the final where they defeated Pocheon FC to become the 2015 Champions.

Current squad
As of 1 July 2022.

References

External links
 Hwaseong FC Daum Cafe 
 Hwaseong FC facebook 

Hwaseong, Gyeonggi
K3 League clubs
K3 League (2007–2019) clubs
Sport in Gyeonggi Province
Association football clubs established in 2013
2013 establishments in South Korea